Beta Phi Sigma was a Pharmacy Fraternity in the United States. Beta Phi Sigma stands for Buffalo Pharmacy School.  Beta Phi Sigma was the first Greek-letter fraternity at the University at Buffalo and the first Greek-letter Pharmaceutical fraternity in the United States.

History 
The fraternity was founded in the office of Dr. Henry G. Bentz on the night of December 15, 1888.  Originally organized by the graduating classes of 1889, Beta Phi Sigma grew from one chapter, Alpha, at the University at Buffalo to eleven chapters before World War II. The induction of so many males into the military decimated the ranks of Pharmacy students so that by the end of World War II Beta Phi Sigma ceased to exist. 

Alpha chapter was reorganized at the University at Buffalo Pharmacy School. This chapter grew until 1973 when the influx of women to the profession reduced the number of men pledging the fraternity; Beta Phi Sigma was dissolved.

There is still an alumni chapter that holds a reunion every ten years, the first being held in 1997.

Song 
Found in the University at Buffalo School of Pharmacy and Pharmaceutical Science Apothecary archives, Beta Phi Sigma had the following song, set in B-flat major:Join hands again and sing for Beta Phi
and pledge anew our vows so firm and high.
To stand for the right and to shun the wrong
forever in our hearts a song.
So now to thee oh Beta Phi we bring
our love and our most humble off-ring.
As we answer the call we'll be true one and all
to the vows we made to thee oh Beta Phi.

Chapters 
Following are the former and current chapters of Beta Phi Sigma. Active chapters are indicated in bold; inactive chapters are indicated in italic.

Notes

See also
 Professional fraternities and sororities
 Rho Chi, co-ed, pharmacy honor society

References 

Professional pharmaceutical fraternities and sororities in the United States
Student organizations established in 1889
1889 establishments in New York (state)